Air sports with the discipline parachuting were introduced as World Games sports at the World Games 1997 in Lahti. At the 2013 World Games in Cali, paragliding was introduced.

Parachuting

Men

Accuracy Landing

Freestyle

Women

Accuracy Landing

Freestyle

Mixed

Accuracy Landing

Canopy Formation, 2-way

Canopy Piloting

Formation Skydiving, 4-way

Freeflying

Freestyle

Paragliding

Men

Accuracy Landing

Women

Accuracy Landing

Paramotoring

Mixed

Paramotor Slalom

Gliding

Mixed

Glider Aerobatics

External links
 World Games at Sports123 by Internet Archive
 2005 World Games info system
 World Games 2013

 
Sports at the World Games
World Games